Mokihinui  is a lightly populated locality on the West Coast of New Zealand's South Island.

Mokihinui is on the Tasman Sea coastline north of Westport and is on the southern side of the Mōkihinui River's mouth, the third largest river on the West Coast. Once known as Waimarie, its official name is currently Mokihinui (without a macron), although it is named after the Mōkihinui River (officially spelled with a macron since 2019). Mokihinui is situated between the sea and the foothills of the Glasgow Range and State Highway 67 passes through Mokihinui just before reaching its northern end on the other side of the river. Statistics New Zealand includes Mokihinui in a statistical area of the same name that covers both the locality itself and its neighbours such as Seddonville and Summerlea. According to the 2013 New Zealand census, Mokihinui has a population of 186, an increase of 15 people since the 2006 census. Mokihinui's population increases during whitebait season, when visitors come to fish in the Mōkihinui River's mouth.

In the early 1890s, a branch line railway from Westport was opened to Mokihinui; it ultimately ran through to Seddonville and was known as the Seddonville Branch.  Passengers were carried on mixed trains until trains became freight-only on 14 October 1946.  The line continued to operate until the end of the 1970s, when the coal mining activity that provided almost the sole freight on the line declined to such a point that revenue was lower than maintenance costs.  The railway closed north of Ngakawau on 3 May 1981 and traces of its formation can be seen in the countryside around Mokihinui.

References 

Buller District
Populated places in the West Coast, New Zealand